KLBJ-FM (93.7 MHz) is a commercial radio station in Austin, Texas broadcasting an album-oriented rock radio format billed as "The Rock of Austin." KLBJ-FM is owned by Sinclair Telecable Inc. (unrelated to television broadcaster Sinclair Broadcast Group, who owns CBS station KEYE) and operated under the name Waterloo Media. The station was once owned by the family of President Lyndon Baines Johnson, and still carries his initials as its call letters.

KLBJ-FM has studios and offices along Interstate 35 in North Austin.  The transmitter and broadcast tower are atop Austin's Mount Larson.  KLBJ-FM broadcasts in the HD Radio format.  Its HD-2 subchannel airs Blues music.

"The Dudley & Bob Show" (Dale Dudley, Bob Fonseca and Matt Bearden), is in the Texas Radio Hall of Fame.  In 2007, it won a Marconi Award from the National Association of Broadcasters for "Medium Market Personality of the Year."  KLBJ-FM holds an annual fishing tournament each year in Jonestown, Texas.

History

Early years with the Johnson family
The station first signed on the air on in 1960, as KTBC-FM, part of the Johnson Family's broadcasting holdings.  In 1943, the future First Lady, known as Claudia T. "Lady Bird" Johnson, invested an inheritance of $17,000 to purchase KTBC (AM).  She improved the station by hiring new on-air talent, found commercial sponsors, kept all the financial accounts, and maintained the facility. Using her formal name, Mrs. Johnson served as manager and then as the first ever chairwoman of what later came to be known as KLBJ, for some four decades.  (In later years, the president and Lady Bird's children ran the radio stations, while she remained chairman.)  Because the stations were owned by Claudia Johnson, Lyndon Johnson did not have to consider divesting the media company, even when he was Senator, Vice President or President.

The Johnson family put Austin's first TV station on the air in 1952, KTBC-TV.  The co-owned FM station signed on the air in 1960.  In 1972, KTBC-FM switched to a Freeform Rock format and change the call letters into KLBJ-FM the station has a sound that was emerging on the FM dial in many cities in America.  Until then, the only rock commonly heard on the radio were a few songs that crossed over onto the Top 40 charts.

Sale the TV and radio stations
In 1973, the Johnsons sold KTBC-TV to the Times Mirror Company, a newspaper and broadcasting company that published the Los Angeles Times and the Dallas Times Herald.  Times Mirror kept the KTBC call sign for the TV station, while the radio stations became KLBJ AM-FM to reflect the initials of President Johnson, who had died earlier that year. (Currently, KTBC-TV is owned by Fox Television Stations.)

The Johnsons divested their radio stations in 1997, and sold KLBJ AM and FM to LBJS Corporation. The corporation was made up of KLBJ executives. KLBJ (AM) had already shifted from MOR to an newsradio format, while KLBJ-FM transformed into a full-fledged album rock format.

In 2003, KLBJ AM and FM were sold to the Indianapolis-based Emmis Communications Company. Emmis had radio stations in several large markets around the U.S., including New York City and Los Angeles.

Discography
KLBJ-FM has produced a number of albums, focusing mainly on local Austin music.  Its "local licks live" series started in 1989 and has showcased dozens of popular Austin musicians.

See also
 Music of Austin

References

External links
KLBJ-FM official website

LBJ-FM
Album-oriented rock radio stations in the United States
Radio stations established in 1972
1972 establishments in Texas